Boozman is a surname. Notable people with the surname include:

Curtis Boozman (1898-1979), American politician
Fay Boozman (1946-2005), American ophthalmologist and politician
John Boozman (born 1950), American politician and former optometrist